John Henry Michael McManus (born 21 January 1974), better known by the stage name Rove McManus, is an Australian triple Gold Logie award-winning comedian, television and radio presenter, producer and media personality. He was the host of the eponymous variety show Rove and was also the host of the comedy talk show Rove LA. He is the co-owner of the production company Roving Enterprises with business partner Craig Campbell. He hosts Whovians on the ABC.

Early life
McManus was born in Perth, Western Australia, to John and Coralie McManus. McManus attended Orana Catholic Primary School before going through grades 8–12 at Corpus Christi College. He acquired the nickname "Rove" as a child, from his sister.

Performing career

Live comedy

McManus is a long established exponent of stand-up comedy, touring nationally and also appearing internationally at major events such as the 2010 Just For Laughs Festival in Montreal and as the host of the 2013 International Comedy Gala.

In 2005 and 2008, McManus undertook live stand-up comedy shows, touring Australian capital cities as well as Wellington and Auckland in New Zealand. During the tour he returned to Melbourne each Tuesday to film Rove Live.

Television
McManus has appeared on Good Morning Australia, John Safran vs God, Pulp Sport, The Living Room, The Project, Studio 10, Celebrity Name Game, Have You Been Paying Attention New Zealand? and Hughesy, We Have a Problem.

McManus's first recorded television appearance was as a child, when he appeared in the ABC television series, Kaboodle as 'Marty', in an episode called "Marty Makes A Move".

After some time as a jack-of-all-trades helping to produce Li'l Elvis and the Truckstoppers, McManus voiced a role in the 1997 "Monkey See, Monkey Do" episode of Li'l Elvis.  In 1997, McManus began hosting The Loft Live, which was produced by RMIT University's Student television station RMITV for the community television station Channel 31, where, according to Rove, he was given a budget of $50 per week. It was there where he met long-time co-host Peter Helliar.  Rove then worked for Foxtel as a roving reporter on a show called In Fashion which was hosted by Hugh Jackman. He then took an offer from the Nine Network for ten late-night episodes of his own variety show, Rove, in 1999, but Nine cancelled the series at the end of its run. In 2000, McManus was offered the opportunity to produce a new version of the Rove show for Network Ten. The resulting Rove Live was almost identical to Nine's Rove. Rove Live became a flagship show for Network Ten, and it was also broadcast on TV3 in New Zealand. The show followed a variety show format and showcased weekly celebrity guests; comedy acts; variety segments; local and international comedians; and live bands.

During the 2004 and 2007 federal elections, McManus unsuccessfully campaigned to have the Australian prime minister, John Howard, appear on his program. While Howard did not appear, then-opposition leaders Mark Latham appeared on the show in 2005 and Kevin Rudd in 2007. After being elected prime minister, Rudd appeared on the show again in 2008 and also on 28 June 2009.

When Bert Newton fell ill in early 2004, McManus was one of many guest presenters who hosted Newton's Good Morning Australia program. McManus hosted the episodes on 24 April and 12 October 2004. The following year, McManus and Newton co-hosted a Roving Enterprises television special Ten Seriously 40, a look at the history of the Ten Network.

In 2004, McManus appeared in comedian John Safran's TV show John Safran vs God in a segment in which Safran convinced the controversial UK Muslim cleric Omar Bakri Muhammad to put a fatwa on McManus. The fatwa was later taken off when Omar Bakri found out that the pictures showing McManus mocking Islam were falsified.

In 2005, McManus co-hosted the historic tri-network tsunami appeal Reach Out with fellow presenters Eddie McGuire and Andrew O'Keefe on three commercial networks Seven, Nine and Ten. The appeal raised over $20 million for tsunami relief efforts around Asia. The event was such a success that the three teamed up just a few months later to host the Logie awards.

In November 2006, after his wife Belinda Emmett died after fighting breast cancer for eight years, McManus took indefinite leave, and Rove Live did not screen its last two planned episodes of the year. At the time, there were unfounded rumours circulating in the industry that he might quit television for good. He returned, however, in the competitive Sunday 8.30 pm timeslot on 1 April 2007 with a major format overhaul, including renaming the show to simply Rove. Rove scored its highest ever audience of 1.69 million viewers. In September 2007, McManus made his debut as a game show host in the Australian version of the US game show Are You Smarter Than a 5th Grader?.

On 2 May 2007, 25 July 2007, and 29 October 2008, McManus appeared as a guest on NBC's The Tonight Show with Jay Leno and as a result had a regular spot on the show. In 2011 he hosted a segment called "Rove Across America" on The Tonight Show. Jay Leno and Ed McMahon also made a small pre-recorded appearance at the beginning of McManus' shows in Los Angeles giving him tips for the night's show.

On 23 December 2008, McManus made his debut as host on American television as the host of an American Broadcasting Company special The List.

On the 2009 series finale of Rove shown on 15 November, following several weeks of rumours that the show was going to end, McManus confirmed live on the show that it would be ending with the 2009 finale. He said: "It's purely my decision. It's not one I've made lightly or flippantly. The timing was right to stop, stand back and see what happens next."

In May 2011, McManus relocated to Los Angeles, California, and landed a hosting role on a new talk show, Rove LA. The show debuted on 19 September 2011, on FOX8, with catch-up airings on The Comedy Channel. The show was subsequently picked up for a two-year run.

In 2013, McManus featured as a subject in the Australian version of the series Who Do You Think You Are?.

McManus has also appeared as a 'Round table' guest on the E! Network late-night talk show Chelsea Lately. He has also made intermittent appearances on TV3's satirical Pulp Sport series, usually performing menial tasks for the hosts, "Bill and Ben".

In 2014, McManus hosted Riot, the US version of the French light entertainment improv show Vendredi Tout est Permis (Friday Anything Goes). In the show, two teams compete on a floor tilted at a 22.5-degree angle. It screened on FOX for one season, and the executive producer was Steve Carell.

On 1 May 2014, McManus appeared on the American comedy show @midnight, presented by Chris Hardwick on Comedy Central. He emerged as the winner, being declared by Hardwick as having won the Internet and being the funniest person in the world for the next 23 and a half hours.

In April 2015, the Game Show Network in the United States debuted a new show hosted by McManus called Lie Detectors, in which audience members decide which of three comedians is telling the truth.

In 2017, McManus presented the new Australian Broadcasting Corporation panel show, Whovians, to tie in with their broadcast of the tenth series of Doctor Who; the show aired on ABC TV Plus. The second season began on 8 October 2018 on ABC TV Plus as a companion to the first episode of the eleventh series of Doctor Who, and there was no Doctor Who series in 2019 so the third series began on 9 February 2020 to tie in with the  twelfth series of Doctor Who.

In 2018, McManus returned to Network Ten to host a new panel show, Show Me the Movie!. He also voiced King Tubby, Cheeta, and Last Chance in the kids TV series, Kitty Is Not a Cat.

In 2018, McManus was given the greenlight for a new show, Bring Back...Saturday Night, after airing a pilot during Network Ten's pilot week. The series premiered on 24 August 2019 under new title, Saturday Night Rove. It lasted two episodes before getting axed, after viewership dropped from 244,000 to 138,000, below the 200,000 viewers cutoff that was set by the network.

Radio
In 1999, McManus was a regular host on Triple J radio and had a segment on the breakfast show (starring Wil Anderson and Adam Spencer) on Friday mornings, Know Your Millennium, a quiz show that looked into the past.

In 2000, he filled in on Triple M Sydney's Andrew Denton Breakfast Show with co-host Amanda Keller and Mike Fitzpatrick.

In 2002, Austereo commissioned Roving Enterprises to create a weekly radio program starring McManus alongside regular Rove colleagues Peter Helliar and Corinne Grant; the show was originally called Saturday Morning Rove and was broadcast on Fox FM every Saturday from 10 am to midday; it was pre-recorded the day before to allow the performers to have a full weekend of other media commitments. In 2004, the program moved to Friday mornings, allowing live phone callers, and was retitled as Rove Live Radio; it was discontinued at the end of 2004.

In 2006, McManus and Helliar filled in for Merrick & Rosso while they were on holiday. In the first week of their three-week stint, Meshel Laurie of Nova 106.9 co-hosted the show as well.

In October 2015, Southern Cross Austereo announced that McManus and Sam Frost would host breakfast on 2Day FM, replacing the ailing The Dan & Maz Show. McManus was on a three-year contract beginning from the start of 2016, which included remuneration of shares valued at $350,000 every six months.

Movie work
McManus had a cameo voicing a crab in Pixar's 2003 animated film Finding Nemo. He appeared as himself on the New Zealand cartoon bro'Town and voices a number of characters in Cartoon Network's Exchange Student Zero.

McManus voiced additional characters in Norm of the North.

In 2014, McManus worked on the film Cookies From Outer Space with Yahoo Serious.

Roving Enterprises

In 2000, McManus started the production company, Roving Enterprises and co-owns it with business partner Craig Campbell. The company co-produced Rove Live and produced the AFL football comedy panel program Before The Game during their runs on Network Ten. It also produces The Project. Past projects include the sketch comedy program skitHOUSE, the parody show Real Stories, Rove LA and, between 2000 and 2004, host and producer of the ARIA Music Awards.

Awards and nominations
McManus is a triple TV Week Gold Logie winner for Most Popular Personality on Australian Television, winning in 2003, 2004 and 2005.

In all he has won 16 Logie Awards and been nominated for several others for his work on Rove and Are You Smarter Than a 5th Grader?. In 2000 McManus was nominated for 'Most Popular New Talent – Male'. In 2002 he was nominated for the Gold Logie Award. In 2006, 2007, 2008 and 2009, he was nominated for the Gold Logie. In 2010, McManus was nominated for the Most Popular TV Presenter and for the Gold Logie.

Charity and community work
Between 2008 and 2010, McManus was a director of the Australian chapter of the conservation charity Fauna & Flora International, for a period serving as the vice-president.

Personal life

McManus married actress and singer Belinda Emmett in 2005 at the Mary Immaculate Church in Waverley, an eastern suburb of Sydney. Emmett died of metastatic breast cancer on 11 November 2006 at St Vincent's Hospital in Sydney.

McManus began dating actress Tasma Walton in October 2007. They married on 16 June 2009 in a private ceremony on a beach in Broome, Western Australia. They have a daughter, born in 2013.

He is a supporter of the Fremantle Football Club in the Australian Football League, for which his first cousin Shaun McManus played 228 games.  For three seasons, starting from 2003, McManus was the number-one ticket holder of the club (a prestigious but largely symbolic position often given to prominent Australians). McManus is also a lifelong fan of professional wrestling, having interviewed both Ric Flair and John Cena on his talk show, and has managed wrestlers as part of the former WWA promotion.

On 8 June 2007, he appeared as the presenter of a secondary school discussion at Rod Laver Arena with Tenzin Gyatso, 14th Dalai Lama, in attendance.

References

External links
 
 
 Roving Enterprises website
 Rove LA

1974 births
Australian children's writers
Australian game show hosts
Australian male comedians
Australian male voice actors
Australian people of Irish descent
Australian people of Scottish descent
Australian radio personalities
Australian Roman Catholics
Australian television talk show hosts
Gold Logie winners
Living people
People educated at Corpus Christi College, Perth
People from Perth, Western Australia
RMITV alumni
Writers who illustrated their own writing